Counting Other Peoples Money is the fifth studio solo album released by rapper Keak da Sneak. It was released on September 23, 2003, for Moe Doe Entertainment and produced by E-A-Ski, Rick Rock, DJ Epik, D-Dre and CMT. The album peaked at No. 87 on the Billboard Top R&B/Hip-Hop Albums chart, No. 37 on the Top Heatseekers chart and No. 38 on the Top Independent Albums chart.

Track listing
"Intro"- 0:50  
"T-Shirt, Blue Jeans, & Nike's"- 3:24 (Featuring E-40) 
"Hi Volume"- 3:58  
"Know What I'm Talkin Bout"- 4:07  
"Rappin My New Twist"- 4:45  
"Copium"- 3:48  
"Hi Speed Specialist"- 3:45  
"Freakalistic"- 3:45  
"Set Up Shop"- 3:44  
"What It Do"- 3:40  
"I Don't Wanna Go"- 3:43  
"Raw"- 3:26  
"Love da Kids"- 3:52  
"Still Can't Get Enough"- 3:43  
"That Be Me"- 3:40  
"Think You Real"- 3:25  
"To Wicked"- 4:10

References

2003 albums
Keak da Sneak albums